CJK strokes are the calligraphic strokes needed to write the Chinese characters in regular script used in East Asian calligraphy. CJK strokes are the classified set of line patterns that may be arranged and combined to form Chinese characters (also known as Hanzi) in use in China, Japan, and Korea.

Purpose 
The study and classification of CJK strokes is used for:
understanding Chinese character calligraphy – the correct method of writing, shape formation and stroke order required for character legibility;
understanding stroke changes according to the style that is in use;
defining stroke naming and counting conventions;
identifying fundamental components of Han radicals; and
their use in computing.

Formation 
When writing Han radicals, a single stroke includes all the motions necessary to produce a given part of a character before lifting the writing instrument from the writing surface; thus, a single stroke may have abrupt changes in direction within the line. For example:
 (Vertical / ) is classified as a basic stroke because it is a single stroke that forms a line moving in one direction.
 (Vertical – Horizontal – Vertical / ) is classified as a compound stroke because it is a single stroke that forms a line that includes one or more abrupt changes in direction. This example is a sequence of three basic strokes written without lifting the writing instrument such as the ink brush from the writing surface.

Direction 

All strokes have direction.  They are unidirectional and start from one entry point. As such, they are usually not written in the reverse direction by native users.  Here are some examples:

Types 
CJK strokes are an attempt to identify and classify all single-stroke components that can be used to write Han radicals. There are some thirty distinct types of strokes recognized in Chinese characters, some of which are compound strokes made from basic strokes. The compound strokes comprise more than one movement of the writing instrument, and many of these have no agreed-upon name.

Basic strokes 
A basic stroke is a single calligraphic mark moving in one direction across a writing surface. The following table lists a selection of basic strokes divided into two stroke groups: simple and combining. "Simple strokes" (such as Horizontal / Héng and Dot / Diǎn) can be written alone. "Combining strokes" (such as Zig / Zhé and J hook / Gōu) never occur alone, but must be paired with at least one other stroke forming a compound stroke. Thus, they are not in themselves individual strokes.

Note, the basic stroke Diǎn  "Dot" is rarely a real dot. Instead it usually takes the shape of a very small line pointing in one of several directions, and may be long enough to be confused with other strokes.

Compound strokes 

A compound stroke (also called a complex stroke) is produced when two or more basic strokes are combined in a single stroke written without lifting the writing instrument from the writing surface. The character  "eternity" described in more detail below demonstrates one of these compound strokes. The centre line is a compound stroke that combines three stroke shapes in a single stroke.

Basics for making compound strokes
In most cases, concatenating basic strokes together form a compound stroke. For example, Vertical / Shù combined with J hook / Gōu produce  (Vertical – J hook / Shù Gōu). A stroke naming convention sums the names of the basic strokes, in the writing order.

An exception to this applies when a stroke makes a turn of 90° (and only of 90°) in the Simplified Chinese names. Horizontal  (Héng) and Vertical  (Shù) strokes are identified only once when they appear as the first stroke of a compound; any single stroke with successive 90° turns down or to the right are indicated by a Zag 折 (pinyin: Zhé) "Break". For example, an initial Shù followed by an abrupt turn right produces  (Shù Zhé). In the same way, an initial Shù followed by an abrupt turn right followed by a second turn down produces  (Shù Zhé Zhé). However, their inherited names are "Vertical – Horizontal" and "Vertical – Horizontal – Vertical".  We need not to use "Zag" in the inherited names.

Nearly all complex strokes can be named using this simple scheme.

Nomenclature 
Organization systems used to describe and differentiate strokes may include the use of roman letters, Chinese characters, numbers, or a combination of these devices. Two methods of organizing CJK strokes are by:

Classification schemes that describe strokes by a naming convention or by conformity to a taxonomy; and
Categorization schemes that differentiate strokes by numeric or topical grouping.

In classification schemes, stroke forms are described, assigned a representative character or letterform, and may be arranged in a hierarchy. In categorization schemes, stroke forms are differentiated, sorted and grouped into like categories; categories may be topical, or assigned by a numeric or alpha-numeric nominal number according to a designed numbering scheme.

Benefits
Organizing strokes into a hierarchy aids a user's understanding by bringing order to an obtuse system of writing that has organically evolved over the period of centuries. In addition, the process of recognizing and describing stroke patterns promotes consistency of stroke formation and usage. When organized by naming convention, classification allows a user to find a stroke quickly in a large stroke collection, makes it easier to detect duplication, and conveys meaning when comparing relationships between strokes. When organized by numbering scheme, categorization aids a user in understanding stroke differences, and makes it easier to make predictions, inferences and decisions about a stroke.

Limitations
Strokes are described and differentiated using the criteria of visual qualities of a stroke. Because this can require subjective interpretation, CJK strokes cannot be placed into a single definitive classification scheme because stroke types lack a universal consensus on the description and number of basic and compound forms. CJK strokes cannot be placed into a single definitive categorization scheme due to visual ambiguity between strokes, and therefore cannot be segregated into mutually exclusive groups. Other factors inhibiting organization based on visual criteria are the variation of writing styles, and the changes of appearance that a stroke undergoes within various characters.

Roman letter naming convention of Unicode standard 
A naming convention is a classification scheme where a controlled vocabulary is used systematically to describe the characteristics of an item. The naming convention for a CJK stroke is derived from the path mark left by the writing instrument. In this instance roman letters are concatenated to form a stroke name as a sequence of one or more roman letters indicating the component strokes used to create the CJK stroke. The first letter of the Han radical’s pinyin pronunciation represents each basic stroke. In a basic stroke example, H represents the stroke  named 横 (pinyin: Héng); in a compound example, HZT represents 横折提 (pinyin: Héng Zhé Tí).

While no consensus exists, there are up to 12 distinct basic strokes that are identified by a unique Han radical.

There are many CJK compound strokes, however there is no consensus for sequence letter naming of compound strokes using the basic strokes. The following table demonstrates the CJK stroke naming convention:

Besides, some strokes have been unified or abandoned in Unicode:

Note that some names in the list do not follow the rules of controlled vocabulary.  For example, stroke P (Piě) is not found in the compound stroke PN. The name "PN" comes from 平捺 (pinyin: Píng Nà), not 撇捺 (pinyin: Piě Nà).  The meaning of 平 (pinyin: Píng) is "flat", and it should be called "BN" 扁捺 (pinyin: Biǎn Nà) if the rules are to be followed closely. The letter "Z" in stroke SWZ means 左 (pinyin: Zuǒ), not 折 (pinyin: Zhé).  The meaning of 左 is "left", and it is not defined in the naming convention.  Moreover, some 折 (pinyin: Zhé) strokes are far more than or far less than 90°, such as stroke HZZZG, stroke HZZP and stroke PZ.

Abbreviated naming conventions 
On the other hand, naming conventions that use abbreviated forms of the CJK strokes also exist. After the names of CJK strokes are translated into English, first letters of the English names are used in the naming system. The controlled vocabulary can be divided into two groups.

The first group is the abbreviated forms of the basic strokes.

The second group is the abbreviated forms of deformations.

“Zig” can be omitted in the naming system.  The following table demonstrates the CJK stroke naming convention:

Numbering scheme 
A numbering scheme is a categorisation method where similar strokes are grouped into categories labeled by nominal numbers. Category numbering may be an index of numbers of types, with sub-types indicated by a decimal point followed by another number or a letter.

The following table is a common numbering scheme that uses similar names as the Roman letter naming convention, but the stroke forms are grouped into major category types (1 to 5), which further break down into 25 sub-types in category 5.

Besides, there are ways of grouping strokes that are different from the Unicode standard.  For example, stroke  is merged into stroke  in Unicode system, while it is merged into  in this numbering scheme.

Stroke order 

Stroke order refers to the order in which the strokes of a Chinese character are written. A stroke is a movement of a writing instrument on a writing surface. Certain stroke orders guidelines are recommended to ensure speed, accuracy, and legibility in composition, as most Chinese characters have many strokes.  As such, teachers enforce exactly one stroke order for each character, marking every deviation as a mistake, so everyone writes these characters the same way. The stroke order follows a few simple rules, though, which aids in memorizing these. To write CJK characters, one must know how to write CJK strokes, and thus, needs to identify the basic strokes that make up a character.

Eight Principles of Yong

The Eight Principles of Yong explain how to write eight common strokes in regular script which are found all in one character,  ("forever", "permanence"). It was traditionally believed that the frequent practice of these principles as a beginning calligrapher could ensure beauty in one's writing.

Eight basic strokes
 － the Diǎn 點 / 点, is a dot, filled from the top, to the bottom, traditionally made by "couching" the brush on the page.
 － the Héng 横, is horizontal, filled from left to right, the same way the Latin letters A, B, C, D are written.
 － the Shù 豎 / 竖, is vertical-falling. The brush begins by a dot on top, then falls downward.
 － the Gōu 鈎(鉤) / 钩, ending another stroke, is a sharp change of direction either down (after a Heng) or left (after a Shù).
 － the Tí 提 / Tiāo 提, is a flick up and rightwards.
 － the Wān 彎 / 弯, follows a concave path on the left or on the right.
 － the Piě 撇, is a falling leftwards (with a slight curve).
 － the Nà 捺, is falling rightwards (with an emphasis at the end of the stroke).
(+  － the Xié 斜 is sometimes added to the 永's strokes. It's a concave Shù falling right, always ended by a Gōu).

Use in computing 

The stroke count method is based on the order of strokes to input characters on Chinese mobile phones.

As part of Chinese character encoding, there have been several proposals to encode the CJK strokes, most of time with a total around 35~40 entries. Most notable is the current Unicode block “CJK Strokes” (U+31C0..U+31EF), with 36 types of strokes:

See also 
 Chinese characters description languages

References

External links 

 Unicode: CJK Strokes, Range: 31C0–31EF — set of 36 CJK strokes
 The Unicode Standard Core Specification: Appendix F - Documentation of CJK Strokes
 Proposal to add twenty strokes to Unicode; this proposal has been approved and is at Stage 6 of the Unicode Pipeline as of July 30, 2007.
 Standardization documents of Inherited Glyphs: List of Strokes for Inherited Glyphs
 Ministry of Education, R.O.C.: Grouping list of CJK Strokes
 State Language Commission, P.R.C.: Chinese Character Component Standard of GB 13000.1 Character Set for Information Processing
 State Language Commission, P.R.C.: Chinese Character Turning Stroke Standard of GB 13000.1 Character Set
 38 CJK strokes, by Wenlin Institute
 Tom Bishop, Richard Cook: Character Description Language (CDL): The Set of Basic CJK Unified Stroke Types
 Yannis Haralambous: Seeking Meaning in a Space Made out of Strokes, Radicals, Characters and Compounds
 Yannis Haralambous: Fonts & Encodings O'Reilly Media Inc., Sept 26 2007, p. 154-156

Chinese characters
East Asian calligraphy
Hanja
Kana
Kanji
Unicode